Steve Johnson was the defending champion, but lost in the first round to Christopher Eubanks.

John Isner won a record fourth Newport title, defeating Alexander Bublik in the final, 7–6(7–2), 6–3.

Seeds
The top four seeds receive a bye into the second round.

Draw

Finals

Top half

Bottom half

Qualifying

Seeds

Qualifiers

Qualifying draw

First qualifier

Second qualifier

Third qualifier

Fourth qualifier

References

 Main draw
 Qualifying draw

Singles